Jorma Vesterinen (11 June 1918 – 20 June 1980) was a Finnish chess player, two-time Finnish Chess Championship medalist (1949, 1950).

Biography
From the late 1940s to the mid-1950s, Jorma Vesterinen was one of Finland's leading chess players. In Finnish Chess Championships he has won two bronze (1949, 1950) medals.

Jorma Vesterinen played for Finland in the Chess Olympiad: In 1954, at second board in the 11th Chess Olympiad in Amsterdam (+3, =10, -5).

References

External links

Jorma Vesterinen chess games at 365chess.com

1918 births
1980 deaths
20th-century chess players
Chess Olympiad competitors
Finnish chess players